Sohaib Nazeer Sultan (August 26, 1980 – April 16, 2021) studied Islamic chaplaincy, Islamic studies, and Christian-Muslim relations at the Hartford Seminary. In 2005, Sultan became the first Muslim chaplain at Yale University, and since then he has gone on to serve as Muslim chaplain for Trinity College and Wesleyan University as well, a particularly important position given that few American institutes of higher learning have Muslim chaplains on the faculty. He was a 2002 graduate of the Hartford Theological Seminary, and the author of The Koran for Dummies (2004), The Qur’an and Sayings of Prophet Muhammad: Selection Annotated and Explained (2007).

He was a public lecturer and writer on Islam, Muslim culture and Muslim-Western relations and occasionally blogged on the Huffington Post Religion section. Additionally, he frequently delivered Islamic Friday sermons, his last being in March 2021.

He was diagnosed with stage 4 bile duct cancer, dying from it on April 16, 2021. His funeral and burial were held the next day.

His book "An American Muslim Guide To The Art Of Islamic Preaching"  was published posthumously in 2023 with a foreword and edits from Martin Nguyen. The book was originally Sultan's master's degree thesis.

References

6. His Funeral Youtube Video

7. His posts on Medium about his thoughts and experiences while living with cancer: https://medium.com/@seekingilham

American imams
21st-century imams
Muslim chaplains
2021 deaths
1980 births